Kumo is a city and the headquarters of Akko local government in Gombe state, northeastern Nigeria. Kumo is the second largest commercial center in Gombe state, It is located on the A345 highway approximately 40 km south of Gombe. It serves as a collecting point for vegetables, peanuts (groundnuts), cotton, and corn  (maize) and as a local trade centre for the sorghum, millet, cowpeas, cassava (manioc), peanuts, goats, cattle, sheep, fowl, horses, donkeys, and cotton raised by the Fulani, Tangale, and Hausa peoples of the surrounding area. The secondary highway between Gombe and Biliri serves the town.

Usman Bello Kumo is the current chairman of the House of Representatives Committee on Police Affairs. He also held the same position in the Seventh Assembly.

Notable people 
Usman Bello Kumo, (Chairman House Committee on Police Affairs)
Aliyu Modibbo Umar, (Former FCT Minister)
Sa'idu Umar Kumo, (politician)

Dr Usman Ardo Kumo
Gidado Bello Kumo
Dr Babayo Ardo Kumo

Infrastructure 
As a growing city, kumo has been slowly expanding with the establishment of various learning institutions and road networks that place the town at an advantageous end. On 26th August 2022, a 66km Gombe-Kumo-Billiri-Kaltungo highway was inaugurated by President Muhammadu Buhari. The sixty-six kilometer road links three States of Gombe, Taraba and Adamawa. While describing the project, the President regarded the highway to be one of the strategic projects aimed at improving the State’s road infrastructure, supporting the ease of doing business, creating jobs and entrenching a prosperous economic environment, in line with the administration’s commitment to eradicate poverty among the citizens of the areas.

References

Cities in Nigeria
Local Government Areas in Gombe State